Mañagaha is a small islet which lies off the west coast of Saipan within its lagoon in the Northern Mariana Islands.  Although it has no permanent residents, Mañagaha is popular among Saipan's tourists as a day-trip destination due to its wide sandy beaches and a number of marine activities including snorkeling, parasailing and jet skiing.

Mañagaha hosts a colony of breeding Wedge-tailed Shearwaters. This seabird nests in burrows principally on the east side of the island.

The island is historically significant for several reasons. It is the burial ground of the famous Carolinian Chief Aghurubw, who is said to have established the first Carolinian settlement in Saipan in 1815. A statue of the chief commemorates his achievements in leading his people from Satawal after a devastating typhoon to Saipan. The island also has remnants of Japanese fortifications from World War II.  The entire island is listed on the United States National Register of Historic Places as a historic district.

Gallery

See also
National Register of Historic Places listings in the Northern Mariana Islands

References

Uninhabited islands of the Northern Mariana Islands
Saipan
National Register of Historic Places in the Northern Mariana Islands
Islands of the Northern Mariana Islands